Waterloo Creek may refer to:

 Waterloo Creek, New South Wales, Australia, the site of the Waterloo Creek massacre in 1837–1838
 Waterloo Creek (Upper Iowa River tributary), in the United States
 Waterloo Creek, a fictional town in Australian children's television series Elly & Jools